Rick Leach and Jim Pugh were the defending champions, but lost in the semifinals to Grant Connell and Glenn Michibata.Pieter Aldrich and Danie Visser won the title, defeating Connell and Michibata 6–4, 4–6, 6–1, 6–4, in the final.

Seeds

Draw

Finals

Top half

Section 1

Section 2

Bottom half

Section 3

Section 4

References
General

External links
 1990 Australian Open – Men's draws and results at the International Tennis Federation

Men's doubles
Australian Open (tennis) by year – Men's doubles